Jean Flammang (9 March 1905, in Esch-sur-Alzette – 1 October 1990) was a Luxembourgian boxer who competed in the 1924 Summer Olympics. In 1924 he was eliminated in the first round of the featherweight class after losing his fight to Arthur Beavis.

References

External links
Jean Flammang's profile at Sports Reference.com

1905 births
1990 deaths
Sportspeople from Esch-sur-Alzette
Luxembourgian male boxers
Featherweight boxers
Olympic boxers of Luxembourg
Boxers at the 1924 Summer Olympics